Haderslev is a town and municipality on the east coast of the Jutland peninsula in the Region of Southern Denmark. It includes the island of Årø as well as several other smaller islands in the Little Belt. Its mayor is Jens Christian Gjesing, representing the Social Democratic Party. Due to Kommunalreformen ("The Municipal Reform" of 2007),  Haderslev municipality was merged on January 1 of that year with the former municipalities of Gram and Vojens, as well as Bjerning, Hjerndrup, and Fjelstrup parishes of Christiansfeld Municipality and Bevtoft parish of Nørre Rangstrup Municipality.

The municipality is part of Triangle Region and of the East Jutland metropolitan area, which had a total population of 1.378 million in 2016.

The waters of Haderslev Fjord cut into the municipality from the Little Belt, dividing the city north-to-south, becoming Haderslev Dam west of the city centre. Årø Strait (Årøsund) separates the bulk of the municipality from the island of Årø, and the two are connected by ferry service between the town of Årøsund on the mainland and the town of Årø on the island.

Locations

The city of Haderslev

The main town and the site of the municipal council is the city of Haderslev.

North Schleswig Germans
Haderslev Municipality is home to the only officially recognised ethno-linguistic minority of Denmark proper, the North Schleswig Germans. This minority makes up about 6% of the total population of the municipalities of Aabenraa/Apenrade, Haderslev/Hadersleben, Sønderborg/Sonderburg and Tønder/Tondern. In these four municipalities, the German minority enjoys certain linguistic rights in accordance with the European Charter for Regional or Minority Languages.

Politics
Haderslev's municipal council consists of 31 members, elected every four years. The municipal council has nine political committees.

Municipal council
Below are the municipal councils elected since the Municipal Reform of 2007.

Notable people
 

Günter Weitling (born 1935), Lutheran theologian, historian, and author

Twin towns – sister cities

Haderslev is twinned with:
 Braine, France

 Sandefjord, Norway
 Uusikaupunki, Finland
 Varberg, Sweden
 Wittenberg, Germany

Sources
 Municipal statistics: NetBorger Kommunefakta, delivered from KMD aka Kommunedata (Municipal Data)
 Municipal mergers and neighbours: Eniro new municipalities map

References

External links

 Municipality's official website (Danish only)
 Haderslev tourism information in English
 The new Haderslev municipality's official website (Danish only)

 
Municipalities of the Region of Southern Denmark
Municipalities of Denmark
Populated places established in 2007